In quantum information theory, strong subadditivity of quantum entropy (SSA) is the relation among the von Neumann entropies of various quantum subsystems of a larger quantum system consisting of three subsystems (or of one quantum system with three degrees of freedom). It is a basic theorem in  modern quantum information theory. It was conjectured by D. W. Robinson and D. Ruelle in 1966 and O. E. Lanford III and D. W. Robinson in 1968 and proved in 1973 by E.H. Lieb and M.B. Ruskai, building on results obtained by Lieb in his proof of the Wigner-Yanase-Dyson conjecture.

The classical version of SSA was long known and appreciated in classical probability theory and information theory. The proof of this relation in the classical case is quite easy, but the quantum case is difficult because of the non-commutativity of the reduced density matrices describing the quantum subsystems.

Some useful references here include:
"Quantum Computation and Quantum Information"
"Quantum Entropy and Its Use"
Trace Inequalities and Quantum Entropy: An Introductory Course

Definitions

Tensor products are denoted by superscripts, e.g., .   The trace 

Density matrix
A  density matrix is a Hermitian, positive semi-definite matrix of trace one. It allows for the description of a quantum system in a mixed state. Density matrices on a tensor product are denoted by superscripts, e.g., 

Entropy
The von Neumann quantum entropy of a density matrix  is 
.

Relative entropy
.

Joint concavity
A function  of two variables is said to be  jointly concave  if for any  the following holds

Subadditivity of entropy

Ordinary subadditivity  concerns only two spaces  and a density matrix . It states that
 
This inequality is true, of course, in classical probability theory, but the latter also contains the
In the quantum case, however, both can be negative, 
e.g. 
can be zero while .  Nevertheless, the subadditivity upper bound on  continues to hold. The closest thing one has 
   

Strong subadditivity (SSA)

Suppose that the Hilbert space of the system is a tensor product of three spaces: . Physically, these three spaces can
be interpreted as the space of three different systems, or else as three parts or three degrees of freedom
of one physical system.

.

Statement
For any tri-partite state  the following holds
,
where , for example.

Equivalently, the statement can be recast in terms of conditional entropies to show that for tripartite state ,
.
This can also be restated in terms of quantum mutual information,
.
These statements run parallel to classical intuition, except that quantum conditional entropies can be negative, and quantum mutual informations can exceed the classical bound of the marginal entropy.

The strong subadditivity inequality was improved in  the following way by Carlen and Lieb 
,
with the optimal constant .

J. Kiefer proved a peripherally related convexity result in 1959, which is a corollary of an operator Schwarz inequality proved  by E.H.Lieb and M.B.Ruskai.  However, these results are comparatively simple, and the proofs do not use the results of Lieb's 1973 paper on convex and concave trace functionals. It was this  paper that  provided the mathematical basis of the proof of SSA by Lieb and Ruskai. The extension from a Hilbert space setting to a von Neumann algebra setting, where states are not given by density matrices, was done by 
Narnhofer and Thirring
.

The theorem can also be obtained by proving numerous equivalent statements, some of which are summarized below.

Wigner–Yanase–Dyson conjecture

E. P. Wigner and M. M. Yanase  proposed a different definition of entropy, which was generalized by Freeman Dyson.

The Wigner–Yanase–Dyson p-skew information
The Wigner–Yanase–Dyson -skew information of a density matrix . with respect to an operator  is

where  is a commutator,  is the

Concavity of p-skew information
It was conjectured by E. P. Wigner and M. M. Yanase in  that - skew information is concave as a function of a density matrix  for a fixed .

As noted in, this conjecture (for all ) implies SSA, and was proved 
in the following more general form: The function of 
two matrix variables 
 

This theorem is an essential part of the proof of SSA in.

First two statements equivalent to SSA

It was pointed out in  that the first statement below is equivalent to SSA and A. Ulhmann in  showed the equivalence between  the second statement below and SSA.
  Note that the conditional entropies  and  do not have to be both non-negative.
 The map  is convex.

Both of these statements were  proved directly in.

Joint convexity of relative entropy
obtains the joint convexity of relative entropy:

Monotonicity of quantum relative entropy 
The relative entropy decreases monotonically under completely positive trace preserving (CPTP) operations  on density matrices,

.

This inequality is called Monotonicity of quantum relative entropy. Owing to the Stinespring factorization theorem, this inequality is a consequence of a particular choice of the CPTP map - a partial trace map described below.

Then

which is called Monotonicity of quantum relative entropy under partial trace.

To see how this follows from the joint convexity of relative entropy, observe that 
 can be written in Uhlmann's representation  as

Since the trace (and hence the relative entropy) is unitarily invariant,
This theorem is due to  Lindblad 
and Uhlmann, whose proof is the one given here.

SSA is obtained from  
 replaced . Take   .
Then   becomes 

Therefore,  
 
which is SSA. Thus,
the monotonicity of quantum relative entropy (which follows from  implies SSA.

Relationship among inequalities
All of the above important inequalities are equivalent to each other, and can also be proved directly. The following are equivalent:
 Monotonicity of quantum relative entropy (MONO);
 Monotonicity of quantum relative entropy under partial trace (MPT);
 Strong subadditivity (SSA);
 Joint convexity of quantum relative entropy (JC);

The following implications show the equivalence between these inequalities.
 MONO  MPT: follows since the MPT is a particular case of MONO;
 MPT  MONO: was shown by Lindblad, using a representation of stochastic maps as a partial trace over an auxiliary system;
 MPT  SSA: follows by taking a particular choice of tri-partite states in MPT, described in the section above, "Monotonicity of quantum relative entropy";
 SSA  MPT: by choosing  to be block diagonal, one can show that SSA implies that the map
 is convex. In  it was observed that this convexity yields MPT;
                                          
 MPT  JC: as it was mentioned above, by choosing  (and similarly) to be block diagonal matrix with blocks  (and ), the partial trace is a sum over blocks so that , so from MPT one can obtain JC;
 JC  SSA: using the 'purification process', Araki and Lieb, observed that one could obtain new useful inequalities from the known ones. By purifying  to  it can be shown that SSA is equivalent to

Since the extreme points of the convex set of density matrices are pure states, SSA follows from JC;

See, for a discussion.

The case of equality

Equality in monotonicity of quantum relative entropy inequality
In, D. Petz showed that the only case of equality in the monotonicity relation is to have a proper "recovery" channel:

if and only if there exists a quantum operator  such that 
  and 
Moreover,  can be given explicitly by the formula 

D. Petz also gave another condition  when the equality holds in Monotonicity of quantum relative entropy: the first statement below. Differentiating it at  we have the second condition. Moreover, M.B. Ruskai gave another proof of the second statement.

if and only if the following equivalent conditions are satisfied:
  for all real .

Equality in strong subadditivity inequality
P. Hayden, R. Jozsa, D. Petz and A. Winter described the states for which the equality holds in SSA.

A state  on a Hilbert space  satisfies strong subadditivity with equality if and only if there is a decomposition of second system as

into a direct sum of tensor products, such that 

Carlen-Lieb Extension 
E. H. Lieb and E.A. Carlen have found an explicit error term in the SSA inequality, namely,

Then, in this "highly quantum" regime, this inequality provides additional information.

The constant 2 is optimal, in the sense that for any constant larger than 2, one can find a state for which the inequality is violated with that constant.

Operator extension of strong subadditivity
In his paper  I. Kim studied an operator extension of strong subadditivity, proving the following inequality:

The proof of this inequality is based on Effros's theorem, for which particular functions and operators are chosen to derive the inequality above.

Extensions of strong subadditivity in terms of recoverability

In 2017, it was shown that the recovery channel can be taken to be the original Petz recovery map. These improvements of strong subadditivity have physical interpretations in terms of recoverability, meaning that if the conditional mutual information  of a tripartite quantum state  is nearly equal to zero, then it is possible to perform a recovery channel  (from system E to AE) such that . These results thus generalize the exact equality conditions mentioned above.

See also
 Von Neumann entropy
 Conditional quantum entropy
 Quantum mutual information
Kullback–Leibler divergence

References

Quantum mechanical entropy
Quantum mechanics